Cycnidolon bimaculatum is a species of beetle in the family Cerambycidae. It was described by Martins in 1960.

References

Cycnidolon
Beetles described in 1960